Wonderwall is a German pop group. In its original formation, its members were Kati (Kathrin), eLa (Daniela) and Jule (Julia).

Discography

Albums
Witchcraft (2002)
What Does It Mean? (2003)
Come Along (2004)

Singles
Witchcraft (2001)
Who Am I? (2001)
Just More (2002)
In April (2002)
Witchcraft 2003 (2003)
(One More) Song for You (2003)
Silent Tears (2004)
Touch the Sky (2004)
Losin´ You (2005)
This is Christmas (2009)
Me and the City (2011)

External links
Official site archived at the Wayback Machine
Official fanclub (archived)
Official English-language fanclub (archived)

German girl groups